The Bridge in the Jungle is a 1971 American adventure film written and directed by Pancho Kohner. The film stars John Huston, Katy Jurado, Elizabeth Guadalupe Chauvet, José Ángel Espinosa 'Ferrusquilla', Enrique Lucero and Jorge Martínez de Hoyos. The film was released in January 1971, by United Artists.

Plot

In a jungle Mexican Village, a boy drowns in a river under a bridge.

Cast 
John Huston as Sleigh
Katy Jurado as Angela
Charles Robinson as Gales
Elizabeth Guadalupe Chauvet as Carmelita 
José Ángel Espinosa 'Ferrusquilla' as Garcia 
Enrique Lucero as Perez
Jorge Martínez de Hoyos as Augustin 
Xavier Marc as Manuel
Chano Urueta as Funeral Singer
Aurora Clavel as Aurelia
Teddy Stauffer as Warner
Eduardo López Rojas as Ignacio 
José Chávez as Hide Trader 
Sergio Calderón as Pedro 
Enrique de Peña as Dancer 
Ramiro Ramírez as Dancer
Carlos Berriochea as First Boy
Juan Antonio Edwards as Second Boy
Elizabeth Dupeyrón as Joaquina 
Gilberto Ramos Atayde as Carlos

See also
 List of American films of 1971

References

External links 
 

1971 films
United Artists films
American adventure films
1970s adventure films
Films based on works by B. Traven
1970s English-language films
1970s American films